The 1996–97 Kazakhstan Cup is the fifth season of the Kazakhstan Cup, the annual nationwide football cup competition of Kazakhstan since the independence of the country. The competition begins on 7 May 1996, and will end with the final in April 1997. Yelimay are the defending champions, having won their first cup in the 1995 competition.

First round

Second round

Quarter-finals

Semi-finals

Final

References

Kazakhstan Cup seasons
1997 domestic association football cups
Cup